"Garden Song" is a popular children's song and American folk song written by David Mallett in 1975.

The song has been recorded by Paul Stookey of Peter, Paul and Mary, John Denver, Pete Seeger, Fred Penner, David LaMotte, Makem and Clancy, Raffi Cavoukian, John Lithgow, Arlo Guthrie, Elizabeth Mitchell, Charlotte Diamond, as well as the Muppets. The version of "Garden Song" covered by John Denver made the national charts.

A picture book version of the song call Inch by Inch: The Garden Song was also created.

References

American children's songs
1975 songs
John Denver songs
Peter, Paul and Mary songs
Song recordings produced by Milt Okun